Herbert Plateau is a portion of the central plateau of Graham Land, Antarctica, lying between Blériot Glacier and Drygalski Glacier. It borders Foster Plateau on the south and Detroit Plateau on the north. The feature was photographed by the Falkland Islands and Dependencies Aerial Survey Expedition in 1956–57 and mapped from these photos by the Falkland Islands Dependencies Survey (FIDS). It was named by the UK Antarctic Place-Names Committee in 1960 for Walter W. Herbert, a FIDS assistant surveyor at the Hope Bay station in 1956 and 1957.

Central plateaus of Graham Land
North to south:
 Laclavère Plateau
 Louis Philippe Plateau
 Detroit Plateau
 Herbert Plateau
 Foster Plateau
 Forbidden Plateau
 Bruce Plateau
 Avery Plateau
 Hemimont Plateau

Further reading 
 Damien Gildea, Antarctic Peninsula - Mountaineering in Antarctica: Travel Guide

References

Plateaus of Antarctica
Landforms of Graham Land
Nordenskjöld Coast
Danco Coast